El Condao is one of nine parishes (administrative divisions) in Laviana, a municipality within the province and autonomous community of Asturias, in northern Spain.

Villages
 L'Aldea
 Boroñes
 El Condao
 La Ferrera
 La Xerra

References

Parishes in Laviana